Primera Toma (Take One) is the first studio album release from the Spanish music trio, La 5ª Estación. It was released in 2002 in Mexico only. The album was initially not well received due to La 5ª Estación's lack of notoriety. However, the album managed to become a hit when the song, "¿Dónde Irán?", was used as the opening theme song for the telenovela, Clase 406. This promotion was their first breakthrough in Latin America and the United States. The song was then chosen as the debut single for the band and was also their first commercial hit in Mexico. After the release of their debut single, La 5ª Estación released two more successful singles from Primera Toma, which were "Perdición" and "No Quiero Perderte".

Track listing

References

La 5ª Estación albums
2001 albums